Kuimetsa is a village in Rapla Parish, Rapla County in northwestern Estonia. Between 1993–2017 (until the administrative reform of Estonian municipalities) the village was located in Kaiu Parish.

References

 

Villages in Rapla County
Kreis Harrien